The International Psychohistorical Association was founded in 1977 in New York by Lloyd deMause, to focus on psychohistory as a science. He was also its first president. The organization publishes Psychohistory News.

References

External links

1977 establishments in the United States
Learned societies of the United States
Psychology organizations based in the United States